Capital Normal University (首都师范大学, pinyin: Shǒudū Shīfàn Dàxué, or 首师大 for short) is a university in Beijing, China.  It is a Chinese state Double First Class University Plan university, identified by the Ministry of Education of China. Founded in 1954, formerly known as Beijing Normal College. In 1992, the branch of Beijing Normal College was merged into Beijing Normal College, and the school was renamed Capital Normal University.

General

Capital Normal University (CNU) was founded in 1954. As a top university included in China's Double First-Class Initiative and a province-ministry co-constructed university co-constructed by Beijing and the Ministry of Education, CNU provides various disciplines including literature, science, engineering, management, law, education, foreign language and art. Over the past 60 years, CNU has cultivated more than 200,000 senior talents and has been an important base for talent cultivation in Beijing.

Presently, CNU runs 17 first-class disciplines for doctoral degree, 101 doctoral programs, 14 postdoctoral research centers, 26 first-class disciplines for master's degree, 142 master programs, 1 doctoral degree type and 16 master's degree types. CNU also has 4 national key disciplines, 1 discipline under national key cultivation, 8 municipal first-class key disciplines, 12 municipal second-class key disciplines, 2 first-class disciplines under municipal key construction, 13 second-class disciplines under municipal key construction, 4 first-class disciplines under municipal key cultivation and 2 municipal key interdisciplines. As for research facilities, CNU has 1 national center for applied mathematics in Beijing, 1 national key laboratory cultivation base under province-ministry co-construction, 2 key laboratories under the Ministry of Education, 1 key research base for humanities and social science of higher education supervised by the Ministry of Education, 1 engineering science research center under the Ministry of Education, 1 key laboratory under the Ministry of Civil Affairs, 1 national experiment teaching demonstration center, 1 national teaching center for virtual simulation experiment, 1 national teaching program for virtual simulation experiment, 1 municipal teaching program for virtual simulation experiment, 1 national and international technological cooperation base, 1 scientific research base under the State Language Work Committee, 1 transformation base for technological achievements under the Ministry of Education, 1 municipal high-tech innovation center of higher education, 1 municipal laboratory, 11 municipal key laboratories, 1 municipal transformation platform for technological achievements, 1 municipal intellectual property pilot unit, 2 municipal engineering research centers of higher education, 1 municipal engineering laboratory, 1 municipal research base for collaboration and innovation of social science and natural science, 4 municipal off-campus talent cultivation bases of higher education, 7 municipal demonstrating centers for experiment teaching, and 14 research centers, institutes and laboratories set by province and ministry. 

CNU boasts of 31 faculties and centers, namely the School of Literature, the School of History, the College of Political Science and Law, the College of Education, the College of Teacher Education, the Capital Institute of Basic Education Development and Research, the School of Psychology, the College of Foreign Languages, the College of Marxism Education, the School of Management, the Music College, the College of Fine Arts, the School of Mathematical Sciences, the Department of Physics, the Department of Chemistry, the College of Life Sciences, the College of Resource Environment and Tourism, the Information Engineering College, the Elementary Education College, the College of Preschool Education, the College of Geospatial Information Science and Technology, the Program in General Education, the School of Continuing Education, the Jingjiang College, the College of International Education, the Research Institute of the Culture of Calligraphy of China, the Honors College, the College of Traditional Chinese Culture Education, the Research Center for Aesthetic Education, the Institute of Cultural Studies, the Academy for Interdisciplinary Studies and so on. It also has the Teaching and Research Department of College English and the Teaching and Research Department of Physical Education. CNU offers 1 major for junior college education, and 54 majors for undergraduate education. There are totally 30,935 students, among whom 193 are full-time through-trained students, 131 are junior college students, 11,645 are undergraduates, 7,084 are postgraduates, 1,027 are PhD students, 9,055 are adult education students and 1,800 are international students. An all-round and multi-level education system covering junior college education, undergraduate education, postgraduate education, doctoral education, post-doctoral education, full-time education, adult education and international education has been formed in CNU.

With a teaching staff of 2,510, CNU now has 1,681 full-time teachers, among whom 394 have a full senior professional title, 657 have an associate senior professional title, 1,133 have a PhD degree, and 475 have a master's degree. Those with a master's degree or higher account for 96% of the total. At present, CNU is home to a number of influential experts and scholars at home and abroad, such as academicians of the Chinese Academy of Science, the Chinese Academy of Engineering, the Russian Academy of Engineering and the Russian Academy of Natural Science, leading scholars included in the 10,000 Talents Program, excellent young scholars included in the 10,000 Talents Program, winners of the National Science Fund for Distinguished Young Scholars, and scholars included in the China Hundred-Thousand-Ten Thousand Program, the Beijing Scholars Plan, Capital Science and Technology Leading Talents Cultivation Program, the Beijing Distinguished Professors Support Plan, the Beijing High-level Talents Introduction and Funding Plan, the Beijing Innovation Team Construction Plan, the Science and Technology New Stars of Beijing, the Young Talents Cultivation Plan, and the Great Wall Scholars Cultivation Plan. Among CNU's teachers, there are 5 members of the Discipline Evaluation Group of the Academic Degrees Committee of the State Council, 11 members of the Discipline Teaching Steering Committee of the Ministry of Education, 5 members of the National Cultural Masters and the Four Batches Talents, 15 members of the Beijing Cultural Masters and the Four Batches Talents, and 3 innovation teams under the Ministry of Education. Another 65 teachers have won Zeng Xianzi Teachers’ Award, Henry Fok Young Teachers’ Teaching Award and Scientific Research Award.

In 2003, CNU was declared as Outstanding University in Undergraduate Teaching in the undergraduate teaching evaluation conducted by the Ministry of Education. So far, CNU has 7 national characteristic majors, 10 municipal characteristic majors, 6 national teaching teams, 9 municipal teaching teams, 8 municipal high-quality undergraduate programs, 8 pieces of municipal high-quality undergraduate courseware, 3 national innovation and experiment zones for talents training mode, 1 municipal innovation pilot zone for talents training mode, 1 national off-campus practice and education base for college students, and 2 municipal demonstration campus innovation and practice bases of higher education. As for courses, CNU has 12 national excellent courses, 29 municipal excellent courses and 1 national bilingual teaching demonstration course. As for textbooks, CNU has 20 textbooks for the 11th Five-year Plan of the Ministry of Education, 5 national excellent textbooks, 1 municipal classical textbook of higher education, 106 municipal excellent textbooks of higher education and 16 national textbooks for undergraduate education in the 12th Five-year Plan. CNU also has excellent open classes, including 1 national excellent video open class, 6 national excellent resource sharing classes, 8 national excellent resource sharing classes for teaching and education and 10 national first-class undergraduate classes. In addition, 2 teachers in CNU hold the National Outstanding Teacher Award and 34 hold the Beijing Municipal Outstanding Teacher Award. In 2008, CNU was included in the National Innovative Experiment Program for College Students. In the evaluation of outstanding teaching achievements, CNU won 3 first prizes and 13 second prizes (including cooperative programs) of the National Outstanding Teaching Achievement Award and 117 prizes of the Beijing Municipal Outstanding Teaching Achievement Award. CNU has 10 programs included in the Beijing Municipal Undergraduate Teaching Reform and Innovation Program. Its students have won many awards in national and Beijing competitions such as the Challenge Cup, mathematical modeling and computer application contest, electronic contest, English speech, etc. Last but not the least, it has achieved remarkable results in cultivating high-level talents. It has won the National Excellent Doctoral Dissertation Award twice, the nomination of the National Excellent Doctoral Dissertation Award for 8 times and the Beijing Municipal Excellent Doctoral Dissertation Award for 9 times.

CNU has 104 research institutes and centers. It set up the Beijing Municipal University Science Park. Since the implementation of the 12th Five-year Plan, 1,689 of CNU's scientific research programs at or above the provincial or ministerial level have been approved, including 544 programs supported by the National Natural Science Foundation of China, 50 programs and sub-programs of the State Key Research and Development Program, 11 topics and sub-topics of the National Technological Support Program, 9 programs and sub-programs of the 863 Program, 17 cooperative programs of the 973 Program, 1 innovation research group program of the National Natural Science Foundation of China, 270 programs of the National Social Science Fund of China and 30 key programs of the National Social Science Fund of China. Additionally, CNU won the second prize of the Natural Science Award of the State Science and Technology Award once, the first prize of the State Science and Technology Advancement Award (as the second unit) once, the Beijing Municipal Science and Technology Award for 13 times and 104 awards above ministerial and provincial level. During the 2018–2019 academic year, CNU has totally invested over 125,820,000 yuan in scientific research programs. As for publications, CNU has Chinese Guide, Language Teaching in Middle School and so on.

With 0.76 million square meters of teaching buildings, the entire CNU campus spans 0.88 million square meters. Its total net value including all the assets is estimated to be 170.716 billion. The CNU library which stores 1452 thousand of books represents one of the national key libraries for documentary reference. Not only that the CNU boasts of a complete digital campus with a stable comprehensive and effective Internet. And there are also artificial turf playgrounds which comply with national standards, gymnasiums, badminton courts, swimming pools and other sports facilities.

CNU is one of the universities approved by the Ministry of Education to accept foreign students and a member of the Beijing-Hong Kong Universities Alliance. It is the only demonstration base for studying in China awarded by the Ministry of Education among the universities in Beijing. It is also the preparatory education base for undergraduate students who come to China under the Chinese Government Scholarship granted by the Ministry of Education, and one of the four universities selected as the first batch of Beijing Chinese Education Base in Beijing. CNU set up the Center for Western European Studies and at the same time was selected as the Beijing Belt and Road National Talents Cultivation Base.

CNU actively holds international cultural exchange activities. So far, it has established inter-university exchanges and cooperation with 265 universities in 47 countries as well as Hong Kong, Macao and Taiwan. Students from 116 countries and regions are receiving education for bachelor's, master's and doctoral degrees. It has also set up 5 Confucius Institutes, 2 Independent Confucius Classrooms and 1 Confucius Classroom Coordination Office, namely the Confucius Institute at St Petersburg State University in Russia, the Confucius Institute at the University of Venice in Italy, the Confucius Institute at the University of Piura in Peru, the Confucius Institute at the University at Buffalo of the State University of New York in America, the Confucius Institute at the University of Bremen in Germany, the Independent Confucius Classroom at the Hungarian-Chinese Bilingual School in Hungary, the Independent Confucius Classroom at the University of Luxor in Egypt and the Confucius Classroom Coordination Office at the St. Cloud State University in America. In collaboration with Flinders University in Australia, it has cultivated 698 Master of Education students.

The CNU High School and the CNU Yuxin School are experimental bases for school education and teaching reforms and the CNU High School is the first listed key high school and demonstration high school in Beijing.

The CNU is always accords great importance to the Party construction and ideological and political educational work. In recent years, the CNU was considered as the national and Beijing municipal “Outstanding University on Party Construction and Ideological and Political Educational Work” by the Organization Department of the CPC Central Committee, the Propaganda Department of the CPC Central Committee, Beijing Municipal Party Committee and Beijing Municipal Government. To add to it, the CNU has won the “Capital Outstanding Unit in Spiritual Civilization Construction”, “Outstanding Unit on Beijing Ideological and Political Educational Work” and other prizes.

In the future, CNU aims for creative and progressive strides towards being a special and excellent normal university.

History

Previously Beijing Normal College, it was renamed Capital Normal University in 1993.

Campus
Capital Normal University comprises eight campuses most of which are located on Third Ring Road in Beijing.   
The southern campus is the headquarters and houses the majority of CNU's academic programs.
The North 1 campus houses the College of International Culture.
The North 2 campus houses the College of Information Engineering.
The East 1 campus houses the College of Education.
The LiangXiang campus houses the Department of Fundamental Education for freshman.

Notable alumni
Wang Hairong, grand-niece of Mao Zedong
Pu Shu, a famous ballad singer
Yuan Tengfei, a famous history teacher

References

External links
Capital Normal University (Chinese)
Capital Normal University (English)

 
Teachers colleges in China
Universities and colleges in Beijing
Schools in Haidian District
Educational institutions established in 1954
1954 establishments in China